The Cluster School of Excellence is a merit system implemented in Malaysia granted to high achieving schools which are in turn given wider autonomy in administration and additional allocation for advancement of specific fields like academics, sports and extra-curricular activities.

Definition

Cluster school is a brand given to schools identified as being excellent in its cluster from the aspects of school administration and student achievement. One of the 6 core strategies in the National Education Blueprint is to foster a culture of excellence in educational institutions within the Malaysian education system by forming "cluster schools of excellence" which selection criteria are based on specific fields like academic, co-curricular and sports achievements. These schools can be emulated by other schools in the same cluster and outside the cluster.

The Cluster Schools of Excellence was launched in 2006.

External links
Information on the Ministry of Education website

 
Education policy in Malaysia